Loni is a feminine given name.

Loni may also refer to:

Places
Loni, Ahmednagar, a village in Maharashtra, India
 Loni, Bijapur, a village in Karnataka, India
 Loni, Ghaziabad, a town in Uttar Pradesh, India
 Luni (Punjab), also spelled Loni, a village in Pakistan

Other uses
 Loni (Pashtun tribe), a tribe in Pakistan
 Laboratory of Neuro Imaging, a research laboratory within the University of Southern California